The 1911 Dickinson Red and White football team was an American football team that represented Dickinson College in Carlisle, Pennsylvania. The team compiled a 4–4 record while competing as an independent during the 1911 college football season. Simon F. Pauxtis was the head coach, and Luther E. Bashore was the captain.

The season began with a  17–0 loss to crosstown rival Carlisle, led by Jim Thorpe and coached by Pop Warner. Dickinson and Carlisle also played midweek scrimmages throughout the season.

The team included fullback/halfback Francis "Mother" Dunn and quarterback Hyman Goldstein, both of whom were among the first three persons inducted into the Dickinson College Athletic Hall of Fame. At the end of the season, Dunn was elected captain of the 1912 team.

Two games were cancelled. A game against Haverford was cancelled due to a wet field. A game against Ursinus was cancelled due to disagreement about eligibility rules.

Schedule

Players

 Luther E. Bashore - guard and captain
 J. Paul Brown - guard
 Francis "Mother" Dunn - halfback
 John L. Felton - lineman and ex-captain
 Hyman Goldstein - quarterback
 A.M. Goodling - substitute guard
 Joseph Z. Hertzler - center
 Jacobs - halfback
 Louis E. Lamborn - end, backfield
 Jacob B. Leidig - end
 Thomas W. MacGregor - tackle
 "Lou" Pearlman - line backer
 Howard S. Rogers - end
 Richard W. Salder - substitute center, backfield
 George Schaeffer - fullback
 Rippey Shearer - tackle
 Elbert W. Stafford - end
 Watkins - substitute guard
 P. Earl West - substitute guard
 Eugene Wilson - substitute quarterback

References

External links
 Microcosm yearbook for 1911-12

Dickinson
Dickinson Red Devils football seasons
Dickinson Red and White football